Ramón Enrique Gaviola (31 August 1900, in Mendoza – 7 August 1989, in Mendoza) was an Argentinian astrophysicist. Student of Richard Gans at the Universidad de La Plata went in 1922 to Germany where he continued his studies in physics.  He studied with Max Planck, Max Born and Albert Einstein, graduating from the University of Berlin in 1926.

Asteroid 2504 Gaviola is named after him.

References 
Notes

Bibliography
 Enrique Gaviola y el Observatorio Astronómico de Córdoba. Su impacto en el desarrollo de la ciencia Argentina. Bernaola, Omar Saber y Tiempo , 2001 QB36.G38 B47 2001
Grunfeld, Veronica. 
Morán-López, José Luis. 
Cielo Sur 
La lista de Gaviola, by Omar Bernaola (Página 12) 
 Observatorio Astronómico de Córdoba 

1900 births
1989 deaths
People from Mendoza, Argentina
20th-century Argentine physicists
Fellows of the American Physical Society